Cédric Cyril Sabin (born 2 November 1979) is a French former professional footballer who played as a forward. At international level, he represented the Martinique national team scoring two goals in two appearances in 2012.

Career
Sabin was born in Paris.

He played two seasons for Konyaspor in the Turkish Süper Lig.

On 15 March 2010, he signed for Shaanxi Chan-Ba from Vannes OC.

Honours
Vannes
 Coupe de la Ligue: runner-up 2008–09

References

Living people
1979 births
Association football forwards
French footballers
Footballers from Paris
Ligue 2 players
Süper Lig players
Chinese Super League players
Qatar Stars League players
ESA Brive players
Red Star F.C. players
FC Gueugnon players
US Créteil-Lusitanos players
CS Sedan Ardennes players
Konyaspor footballers
Vannes OC players
Beijing Renhe F.C. players
Al Ahli SC (Doha) players
Martiniquais footballers
Martinique international footballers
French expatriate footballers
Expatriate footballers in Qatar
Expatriate footballers in Turkey
Expatriate footballers in China
French expatriate sportspeople in China